() is a quarter in the borough of  in Berlin, Germany, that takes its name from the small lake  (literally 'White Lake') within it. A fictional German-language TV series by the same name is set in the borough between 1980 and 1990 during the communist era.

History

From 1914 onwards, the Weissensee Studios produced a number of silent films including works by Fritz Lang and the expressionist film The Cabinet of Dr. Caligari.

However its popularity is increasing due to its proximity to the hip but expensive . Its trams make reaching  very convenient.

Overview
 is appreciated as a good choice for people seeking for a balance between urban life and seclusion in a peaceful district of Berlin. The immediate area around the lake  is characterized by its historical architecture, numerous places of interest, parks, lakes and activities. The Weißensee Academy of Art Berlin ( is of national rank. The  cycling track has also hosted popular music concerts. The largest concert ever held here was a Bruce Springsteen concert on July 19, 1988. Springsteen played before an estimated crowd of 500,000. At Weißensee Cemetery, one of Europe's largest Jewish cemeteries, notable people like the painter Lesser Ury and the publishers Samuel Fischer and Rudolf Mosse are buried.

References

External links

 tic-berlin: tourist & historical information about Weißensee
 Gustav-Adolf Street
 Article from Exberliner magazine

Localities of Berlin
Weissensee
Former boroughs of Berlin
Populated places established in the 1310s